Tohu wa-bohu or Tohu va-Vohu is a Biblical Hebrew phrase found in the  Genesis creation narrative (Genesis 1:2) that describes the condition of the earth 
immediately before the creation of light in Genesis 1:3. 

Numerous interpretations of this phrase are made by various theological sources. The King James Version translation of the phrase is "without form, and void", corresponding to Septuagint , "unseen and unformed".

Text 

The two Hebrew words are properly segolates, spelled tohuw and bohuw. Hebrew tohuw translates to "wasteness, that which is laid waste, desert; emptiness, vanity; nothing". Tohuw is frequently used in the Book of Isaiah in the sense of "vanity", but bohuw occurs nowhere else in the Hebrew Bible (outside of Genesis 1:2, the passage in  Isaiah 34:11 mentioned above, and in Jeremiah 4:23, which is a reference to Genesis 1:2), its use alongside tohu being mere paronomasia, and is given the equivalent translation of "emptiness, voidness".

Rabbinical interpretation 

In the early rabbinical period, the verse was a point of contention regarding the question of creatio ex nihilo. In Genesis Rabbah 1:14, Rabbi Akiva refutes  gnostic and other heretical views that matter existed primordially and that God alone did not create the world.
In Genesis Rabbah 2:2, rabbis Abbahu and Judah b. Simon give analogies in which tohu wa-bohu means "bewildered and astonished" (mentally formless and void), referring to the Earth's confusion after, having been created simultaneously with the Heavens in Genesis 1:1, it now immediately plays an inferior role.

Abraham bar Hiyya (12th century) was the first to interpret the tohu and bohu of Gen. 1:2 as meaning "matter" and "form", and the same idea appears in Bahir 2.9–10. 

Possibly related to the concept of "formless and void" is the  Yesod hapashut (יְסוֹד הפשוט"simple element") in the Kabbalah, in which "everything is united as one, without differentiation".

Use in modern culture 
The phrase is featured on the front of Godspeed You! Black Emperor's EP Slow Riot for New Zero Kanada, referring to the use of the phrase in Jeremiah 4:23. Jeremiah 4:23-27 is shown on the back of the album cover.

Tohu and Bohu are used as names for monsters in McCrae web-novel 'Worm'.

Tohuvabohu is the name of KMFDM's 15th studio album, as well as the title track on the album.

See also
 Abzu
 Chaos (cosmogony)
 Cosmic ocean
 Tehom
 Tohu and Tikun
 The Void (philosophy)
 Hundun

References

External links 

Book of Genesis
Bereshit (parashah)
Creation myths
Hebrew words and phrases in the Hebrew Bible